Geoff Angus (born 19 August 1948) is a former Australian rules footballer who played with Hawthorn in the VFL.

Angus played as a centreman during his career and made his debut for Hawthorn in 1967. He was a member of their 1971 premiership side.

External links

1948 births
Living people
People educated at Carey Baptist Grammar School
Australian rules footballers from Victoria (Australia)
Hawthorn Football Club players
Hawthorn Football Club Premiership players
One-time VFL/AFL Premiership players